() is a Spanish television mystery music game show series based on South Korean programme I Can See Your Voice. Since its premiere on 8 September 2021, it has aired two seasons on Antena 3.

Gameplay

Format
Presented with a group of nine "mystery singers" identified only by their occupation, a guest artist and contestant must attempt to eliminate bad singers from the group without ever hearing them sing, assisted by clues and a celebrity panel over the course of six rounds. At the end of the game, the last remaining mystery singer is revealed as either good or bad by means of a duet between them and one of the guest artists.

Rewards
The contestant must eliminate one mystery singer at the end of each round, receiving  if they eliminate a bad singer. At the end of the game, the contestant may either end the game and keep the money they had won in previous rounds, or risk it for a chance to double its winnings as jackpot prize by correctly guessing whether the last remaining mystery singer is good or bad. If the singer is bad, the contestant's winnings is given to the bad singer instead.

Rounds
Each episode presents the guest artist and contestant with nine people whose identities and singing voices are kept concealed until they are eliminated to perform on the "stage of truth" or remain in the end to perform the final duet.

Notes:

Production
Atresmedia first announced the development of the series in November 2020, following the successful broadcasts of The Masked Singer. It is produced by Warner Bros. International Television Production; the staff team is managed by executive producer Carlos Fernández, producer Eva Barba, and directors Antonio González and Jordi Rosell.

Tapings for the programme took place at an unknown location in Madrid.

Broadcast
Veo cómo cantas debuted on 8 September 2021. Despite the possibility of that series with an upcoming second season being discontinued, it was suddenly renewed and premiered on 29 July 2022, a week after the seventh-season finale of La Voz Kids.

Cast
"The series employs a team of "celebrity panelists" who decipher mystery singers' evidences throughout the game. Alongside with full-timers and additional ones, guest panelists also appear since the first season. Throughout its broadcast, the programme has assigned 4 different panelists.

Series overview

Episodes

Season 1 (2021)

Season 2 (2022)

Accolades

Notes

References

External links

Veo cómo cantas
2020s Spanish television series
2021 Spanish television series debuts
Antena 3 (Spanish TV channel) original programming
Spanish game shows
Spanish television series based on South Korean television series
Spanish-language television shows